Antonio Bichi (1614–1691) was a Roman Catholic cardinal.

Biography
He was born in Siena to Onorata Mignanelli and Fermano Bichi. Antonio's maternal uncle was Pope Alexander VII, who named him cardinal in pectore by 1657.

On 8 Dec 1652, he was consecrated bishop by Niccolò Albergati-Ludovisi, Cardinal-Priest of Santa Maria degli Angeli e dei Martiri, with Ranuccio Scotti Douglas, Bishop Emeritus of Borgo San Donnino, and Filippo Casoni (bishop), Bishop of Borgo San Donnino, serving as co-consecrators.

While bishop, he was the principal consecrator of Paolo Pecci, Bishop of Massa Marittima (1679).

References

1614 births
1691 deaths
17th-century Italian cardinals
17th-century Italian Roman Catholic bishops